Rushen Castle may refer to:

Historic Building
 Castle Rushen is a medieval castle located in the Isle of Man's historic capital, Castletown.

Ships
HMS Rushen Castle, a Royal Navy Castle-class corvette launched in 1943.
SS Rushen Castle, a packet steamer  which was operated by the Isle of Man Steam Packet Company from her purchase in 1928 until she was sold for breaking in 1947.